The Gordon E. Moore Medal is an award given yearly by the Society of Chemical Industry (SCI America) to someone who has displayed early career success involving innovation in chemical industries. Success is judged in terms of both market impact and effects on quality of life of their work.

Recipients 
 2019, John Sworen (Chemours Company)
 2018, Steven Swier (Dow Corning)
 2017, Melinda H. Keefe (Dow)
 2016, Abhishek Roy (Dow)
 2015, John A. McCauley (Merck)
 2014, Andrew E. Taggi (DuPont)
 2013, Jerzy Klosin (Dow)
 2012, Dean E. Rende (Honeywell)
 2011, Doron Levin (ExxonMobil)
 2010, Emmett Crawford (Eastman Chemical Company)
 2009, Emma Parmee (Merck & Co.)
 2008, Edmund M. Carnahan (Dow)
 2007, Paul A. Sagel (Procter & Gamble)
 2006, Jonathan M. McConnachie (ExxonMobil)
 2005, Jeffery John Hale (Merck & Co.)
 2004, George G. Barclay (Rohm and Haas)

Gallery

External links
 Gordon E. Moore Medal, SCI

See also

 List of chemistry awards

References

Awards established in 2004
Chemistry awards